Tārūt Island is an island in the Persian Gulf belonging to the Eastern Province of Saudi Arabia, connected by two causeways to Qatif. It is six kilometers from the coast, and is the longest island in the Persian Gulf after Qeshm Island, extending from Ra’s Tannurah in the north to Qatif in the west. The island has an area of 70 square kilometers, and a population (2010) of 77,757. It contains a number of towns and villages, including Tārūt itself, Deyrah, and Darīn.

History
Tarout's history dates back to pre-5000 BC. It is considered one of the most ancient sites that were inhabited by humans, as well as one of the oldest areas along the Arabian Peninsula.

Tarout was the heart of Dilmun Kingdom and had a major role in the history of the region since 3000 BC. Human habitation in this area over the centuries was very large and archaeological discoveries were found until recently, which is rare in most parts of the world's archaeological sites.

The Island had a significant role in trade activity in the entire Persian Gulf region. It was a central point for trade between Mesopotamia and along the coastal areas in the east of the Arabian Peninsula. Its strong relationships with many of the urbanized areas along the region were well known.

The Christian practice that a marriage was only valid if blessed by a priest was first mandated by a synod of Christians living in the region held in Darin in 676 CE by Patriarch George I—chief bishop of the Church of the East, one of the two main churches of the Syriac Christian tradition.

History of the name
The ancient Arabic name for the place was apparently 'Ishtarut (عشتروت); in the Greek Geographia of Ptolemy it is called Tharrō (θαρρώ); on a map Ptolemy’s Geographia published in Latin in 1578 it appears as Tharro.

In the Middle Ages the island was often called Dairin or Daryn, for one of its cities.; Darīn is actually the name of its main harbor, and there have also been more modern attempts to rename it Darīn. The Treaty of Darin was signed on the island in 1915 between Ibn Saud and the United Kingdom.

Archaeology

Archaeological finds indicate that the island has been inhabited since 5000 BC; and it was later home to people from the civilization of Dilmun, Akkadians, Assyrians and Persians. Later it was occupied by the Persian Empire, the Islamic Empire; it was colonized by the Portuguese and later made part of the Ottoman Empire.

The most important collections found in the Tarout was pure golden statue representing Ashtaroot goddess. The statue was found placed on the ground in one of the palm groves in the Tarout.

There are many other statues, copper and pottery vessels and traditional weapons found in the Tarout that are displayed in the Riyadh Museum. It also contains a Portuguese fort which is located in Al Deyrah. The Portuguese castle was repaired in the 951H, which had been built on the ruins of former settlements and one of the oldest ones, dating back to over 5,000 years ago.

The site consists of the Fortress of Al-Sheikh Muhammad bin Abdul Wahhab Al Fehani, which was built in 1303H as well as the Fortress of Abu Al-leaf, which is located between the Tarout and Al Qatif, in addition to the three mosques on the old road from Al Qatif.

In 1959 a man cleaning a street discovered rocks with Sabaean inscriptions on them. The most famous artefacts found on Tārūt were unearthed by Danish archaeologists in 1968; they excavated shards of pottery dating back to 4,500 BC, and others from 3000 BC. When the municipality of Qatīf wanted to build a causeway to Tārūt in 1962 they took sand from the hill known as Tell Rafī’ah, and found Stone Age artifacts, including pottery, and a statue. The last discovery was in 1993 on Tell Rafī’ah. Sometimes archaeological ruins are discovered by accident; something that occurred when a car repair workshop was being renovated and tombs dating back to 2000 BC were found.

Many vessels have been found on Tārūt carved from steatite, particularly from Tell Rafī'ah; the designs are very artistic and include representations of cats, nude men, and motifs connected with the sea and fishing. The source of the steatite was actually in South Western Persia, but the carving industry seems to have been a local one.

Among the ancient statues discovered in Tārūt is one of a naked man made out of dark grey stone. It was found in the 1950s by a man ploughing his field. It is 94 cm high, and the man is standing in a reverential posture, with wide eyes. It is almost certainly Sumerian in origin, though it was found about 1000 kilometers from the nearest city of Sumer. It is a very high quality object, but was almost destroyed by the superstitious villagers, who thought it had something to do with spirits (jinn), and so cut it in half and beheaded it. It has been restored and now stands the National Museum of Riyadh.

In 1962 when some of the inhabitants of the village of Rabī'iyah were replacing their former thatched houses with buildings of stone and plaster, a man climbing some of the hills looking for stones, they chanced upon a jar, and then discovered a number of graves, which experts later suggested were likely to be Jewish in origin. They also found many earthenware vessels at the same site. At Khārijīyah in the north of Tārūt many clay figurines have also been found.

Transport

Sea port 
Tarout Island represents one of the most important sea ports in all parts of Saudi Arabia.

In ancient times, the island was a vital seaport to receive boats from the Persian Gulf and Indian Ocean. Tarout was a metropolis on the island, which took its name from its castle, which is located in the heart of the island, surrounded by small villages.

Tarout Castle 

Tarout Castle is located in the center of Tarout Island at the edge of Al Deyrah village. The castle was built in the period from 1515 to 1521. So far it is unknown who built it, although some archeologists suggest that it was built by the residents of Qatif and Tarout to protect them from Portuguese attacks, while some researchers indicate that the castle was built by the Portuguese to protect themselves from Turkish attacks, but they were forced to hand it over in 1559 and they withdrew from the Tarout island of to Awal Island,(now Bahrain).

The castle is consisting of 4 towers. Its courtyard is a rectangle with a central deep well, which is believed to be used to store provisions during the times of blockage. King Abdul Aziz Dara is enjoying a lot of archaeological material of historical significance, which was discovered at the Tarout Heritage Palace. The later found material is an ancient army cannon going dating back to the same time, which is currently being shown in the Dammam Regional Museum.

Attractions 

 Tarout historical fort 
 Al Rafiea airport (1911-1932) ; built in 1911 during World War I by the British Empire
 Fortress of Abu Al-leaf built in the 16th century by the Portuguese; destroyed by the British Empire in 1866
 Darin seaport
 Darin historical fort
 Traditional Houses
 Al Khudar mosque 
 Darin cornice
 Sanabis cornice
 Al Zoor cornice
 Visitor's center on front of Darin seaport and on the left side of ruins of the palace. (Must see place). It's museum in the traditional house (200y.o.).

Main villages 

 Al Rabieia
 Al Zoor
 Dareen
 Al Deyrah: Tarout Center at the present time is known as Al Deyrah, which represents a major administrative center of the villages during different periods. Al Dira County Quarter is the oldest Quarter on the island dating back to Phoenician times, where you can see the adjacent stone and mud buildings crisscrossed by narrow streets and corridors. Wandering through the streets will remind you of the fragrance of historical periods of the ancient place. Al Deyrah was surrounded by a fence for the purpose of protection from attacks by invaders. To its east side it is adjoined by the Tarout castle, which is considered a well-fortified castle on the island. The castle is located on a tall hill, which is the highest place on the island. The island consists of Ain Tarut. In the early times, that was the only source of water on the island, and it is known as "Hamam Tarout ”, the Tarout Bath.
 Sanabes
 Fariq Al Atrish

See also 

 Qatif
 Saihat
 Safwa City
 Sanabes
 Al-Awjam

References

External links

 Portuguese Fort at Tarout Island, Splendid Arabia: A travel site with photos and routes

Geography of Saudi Arabia
Islands of Saudi Arabia
Archaeological sites in Saudi Arabia
Former Portuguese colonies
Islands of the Persian Gulf
Phoenician colonies in Asia